Omereque Municipality is the third municipal section of the Narciso Campero Province in the Cochabamba Department, Bolivia. Its seat is Omereque.

Cantons 
The municipality is divided into six cantons. They are (their seats in parentheses):
 Chari Chari Canton - (Chari Chari)
 Ele Ele Canton - (Ele Ele)
 Huanacuni Grande Canton - (Huanacuni Grande)
 Omereque Canton - (Omereque)
 Peña Colorada Canton - (Peña Colorada)
 Perereta Canton - (Perereta)

References 

 Instituto Nacional de Estadistica de Bolivia

External links 
 Population data and map of Omereque Municipality

Municipalities of the Cochabamba Department